Gruben has different meanings:

Places 
 Gruben/Meiden, a village in the canton of Valais, Switzerland
 Gruben, a village in the municipality of Rana in Nordland county, Norway

People 
 Federico Grüben, an Argentine Olympic shooter
 Franz Josef von Gruben (1829–1888), a German politician
 Patricia Gruben, an American-born filmmaker
 Thierry de Gruben, a former Ambassador from the Kingdom of Belgium to the United Kingdom

See also
 Tuktoyaktuk/James Gruben Airport, an airport in northern Canada